Will Brittain (born August 10, 1990) is an American actor. He has had roles in the films A Teacher (2013), Lila & Eve (2015), and Everybody Wants Some!! (2016).

Filmography

References

External links

 

1990 births
Living people
21st-century American male actors
American male film actors